State Highway 17 (SH 17)  runs from Marfa to Pecos in west Texas. The road is maintained by the Texas Department of Transportation (TxDOT).

Route description

 begins at Marfa in Presidio County, passes through Jeff Davis County, and terminates at Pecos in Reeves County.

Presidio County

 begins at an intersection of San Antonio Street and Highland Avenue.

After two blocks,  intersects the beginning of Farm to Market Road 1112 ( which proceeds eastward along E. Oak Street which runs parallel to the Union Pacific Railroad.

 proceeds north an additional two blocks, then turns east along E. Lincoln Street directly in front of the Presidio County Courthouse. One block later, the route turns north and leaves Marfa along N. Dean Street. North of town, the route passes Marfa Municipal Airport.

 continues toward Fort Davis as a two-lane roadway with a  speed limit. The route follows mostly straight stretches with no sharp turns or steep grades through open ranch land.

Jeff Davis County

Soon after entering Jeff Davis County,  continues through a gentle pass across the Puertacitas Mountains. The route then passes along mostly straight stretches through ranch land. At this point,  joins the Davis Mountains Scenic Loop.

The road then enters Fort Davis where the route is called State Street.  intersects  approaching from the east via Musquiz Drive just south of the Jeff Davis County Courthouse. The route intersects Lt. Flipper Drive, the entrance to the historic site. Across from the historic site, the route intersects Blackfoot Drive, known locally as Old Balmorhea Road which is the route's former unpaved roadway before the establishment of the state highway system. Just beyond the historic site, the route intersects Canyon Drive. At this point, Davis Mountains Scenic Loop, and the Texas Mountain Trail leave the route and continue west along Canyon Dr. toward Davis Mountains State Park, McDonald Observatory, and Kent.

There are also several picnic tables in the canyon followed by one large picnic area just before reaching Wild Rose Pass. The route remains a two-lane road, but from this point onward there are places where passing lanes occur.

Continuing northward, the route intersects the eastern terminus of  approaching from Buffalo Trails Boy Scout Ranch.  then continues through ranch land and leaves the Davis Mountains before leaving the county.

Reeves County
The route continues northward and intersects  at Toyahvale.  is the former roadway of  before it was replaced by Interstate 10 (I-10).  turns east onto the former  roadway and reaches Texas Park Road 30 into Balmorhea State Park at Toyahvale.

Continuing into Balmorhea, the route passes fields of alfalfa watered from irrigation ditches including one running parallel with the highway. In Balmorhea, this irrigation channel becomes the centerpiece of a city park along one side of  here known as Main Street. The route intersects Business Interstate 10-F at North Fort Worth Street. I-10 Bus. Loop F going northward becomes  to Toyah after crossing I-10. Eastward, I-10 Bus.

At I-10 Exit 209, I-10 Bus. In the center of Saragosa,  turns westward at West Main Street and loops back to end at the north service road of I-10 and  without crossing or intersecting the main Interstate roadway.

Beyond Saragosa, the route begins to parallel the route of the Pecos Valley Southern Railway which will follow  the rest of the way into Pecos. The speed limit gradually increases to  before intersecting . The route then intersects  before passing through the small community of Verhalen. The route then intersects  and later .

The route passes alongside the community of Lindsay as it approaches the outskirts of Pecos. The route then passes Pecos Municipal Airport. In Pecos, the route intersects I-20 at Exit 39 then continues north as South Bickley Avenue. The route then intersects  at Stafford Boulevard. Then, further north,  terminates at West 3rd Street where it intersects Business Interstate 20-B.

History
 SH 17 was one of the original 25 highways proposed in Texas on June 21, 1917. The original route was to be from another proposed route State Highway 12 running along the Rio Grande to Sanderson, then through Fort Stockton and Pecos to the New Mexico state line. On February 20, 1918, SH 17 was rerouted north of Fort Stockton, going through Grandfalls and Barstow to Pecos. On January 23, 1922, a separate route, SH 17A, running from Balmorhea to Pecos was designated. On July 18, 1922, SH 17 was rerouted north of Grandfalls, with a spur along the old route from Grandfalls to Barstow, and SH 17A extended south to Alpine via Fort Davis.

All route descriptions before 1924 were merely proposals. The Texas Highway Department, a precursor of the Texas Department of Transportation, did not have the authority to assume maintenance of roads from the counties until 1924, nor the authority to plan, survey, or build new roads until 1925. On August 21, 1923, the section of SH 17 south of SH 17A had been transferred to SH 82, while SH 17A and the section of SH 17 north of SH 17A was reclassified as the main route of SH 17. The spur from Grandfalls to Barstow was cancelled. On May 1, 1931, SH 17 was extended through Marfa to end in Presidio, replacing  SH 118 (which was reassigned on the former route of SH 3 southeast of Fort Davis) and a section of SH 3. On June 20, 1933, the stretch from Pecos to New Mexico had been transferred to SH 27. On September 26, 1939, the stretch from Presidio to Marfa was transferred to U.S. Highway 67 (the routes were concurrent before this).

Major intersections

See also

References

External links

 Texas Mountain Trail

017
Transportation in Presidio County, Texas
Transportation in Jeff Davis County, Texas
Transportation in Reeves County, Texas
Marfa, Texas
Pecos, Texas